Iambadoule is a Thracian goddess, epigraphically testified together with the Thracian god Zberthourdos (Sbelsurdos).

The inscription in Ancient Greek:

θεῷ Ζβερθούρδῳ καὶ Ἰαμβαδούλῃ, ἐπιφανηστάτοις, Αὐρ(ήλιος) Διονύσιος, στρατ(ιώτης) χῶρτις τοῦ πραιτ(ωρίου) ἑκατοντάρχ(ου) Φλωρεντίνου, θέλων ἀνέθηκα

Translation:

To God Zberthourdos and Iambaldoule, the most prominent, Aurelius Dionysius, a local soldier of the praetorian centurion Florentinus, wished to dedicate.

Legacy
According to researcher Dragoslav Antonijević, Dragojlovic argued that the South Slavic character of the samovila (a fairy-like figure) is a continuation of this Thracian goddess.

References

Thracian goddesses